The Florida State University College of Criminology and Criminal Justice is one of sixteen colleges comprising the Florida State University (FSU). The College is the oldest program of its kind. It offers bachelor's, master's, and doctoral degrees.

The College's faculty members lead the nation in funding for education and delinquency research, they conduct the most recognized research on fear and crime, they are known internationally for law enforcement research, they are the most cited for national gun control research, and they are prominent scholars in the areas of self-control and crime and juvenile sentencing.

With $11 million in externally funded research projects, the College's Center for Criminology and Public Policy Research conducts research that promotes evidence-based policy-making and practice at state and national levels. It also provides unique hands-on research opportunities for graduate students.

History

The first offering of criminology courses at Florida State University began in the early 1950s in the Department of Criminology and Corrections within the School of Social Welfare. In 1973, the School of Criminology was established to offer degree programs at the bachelor's, master's, and doctoral levels in criminology. Dr. Eugene Czajkoski, a criminology faculty member receptive to both research and practice, was the School's Founding Dean. Czajkowski served as Dean of the School from 1973 until late 1986.

In 2012, Eppes Hall, under the direction of Thomas Blomberg, dean of the College of Criminology and Criminal Justice, underwent a $3 million transformation. In 2013, 95 years after first opening its doors to students, Eppes Hall became the new home to one of Florida State University's highest ranked academic programs, the College of Criminology & Criminal Justice. In 2014, the College of Criminology and Criminal Justice won the 2014 Tallahassee/Leon County Historic Preservation Award for outstanding achievement in the Civic/Community Resource Preservation category for the renovation of Eppes Hall.

National rankings
The online Bachelor's program is ranked #1 in the nation by OnlineU.org.
The College's faculty is ranked number one in the nation for scholarly productivity, compared to all other criminology doctoral programs in the country, by the Journal of Criminal Justice Education (2011).
The top two criminologists in the country are faculty members at FSU.
The online graduate program in criminal justice is ranked #5 by U.S. News & World Report.
The graduate program is ranked #7 by U.S. News & World Report.
The online Bachelor's and Master's programs are ranked in the top ten by SuperScholar.org.
The online Bachelor's program is ranked #2 in the nation by BestColleges.com.
The online master's degree is ranked in the top ten by TheBestColleges.org.

The Journal of Criminal Justice Education ranked Florida State's College of Criminology and Criminal Justice No. 1 in the nation for faculty research.

In 2015, the online criminology bachelor's degree program was ranked 2nd in the nation among both public and private universities by BestColleges.com

References

http://criminology.fsu.edu/

External links
 

 
University subdivisions in Florida
1974 establishments in Florida